Mohammed Sarwar Yusufzai  was an Afghan footballer, who competed at the 1948 Summer Olympic Games.

References

External links
 Sport-Reference
  

Afghan footballers
Olympic footballers of Afghanistan
Footballers at the 1948 Summer Olympics
Possibly living people
Year of birth missing
Association football defenders